Kahriz (also Romanized as Kahrīz) is a village in Kanduleh Rural District, Dinavar District, Sahneh County, Kermanshah Province, Iran. At the 2006 census, its population was 101, in 27 families.

References 

Populated places in Sahneh County